Maryvale High School may refer to

 Maryvale High School (Cheektowaga, New York)
 Maryvale High School (Phoenix, Arizona)